This is the results breakdown of the local elections held in Navarre on 27 May 2007. The following tables show detailed results in the autonomous community's most populous municipalities, sorted alphabetically.

Overall

City control
The following table lists party control in the most populous municipalities, including provincial capitals (shown in bold). Gains for a party are displayed with the cell's background shaded in that party's colour.

Municipalities

Barañain
Population: 22,401

Burlada
Population: 18,388

Egüés
Population: 5,379

Estella
Population: 13,892

Pamplona
Population: 195,769

Tafalla
Population: 11,040

Tudela
Population: 32,802

See also
2007 Navarrese regional election

References

Navarre
2007